Trish O’Halloran is a camogie player, winner of an All-Star award in 2008 and an All Ireland medal in 2003.

References

Living people
Tipperary camogie players
Year of birth missing (living people)